The 2000–01 season was Chelsea F.C.'s 87th competitive season, ninth consecutive season in the FA Premier League and 95th year as a club.

Season summary
A slow start to the season cost manager Gianluca Vialli his job, despite having won five trophies since his appointment in February 1998. The last of these trophies came at the start of the season when they defeated Manchester United 2–0 in the Charity Shield to win the last-ever club game at the pre-redevelopment Wembley. Vialli's successor was Claudio Ranieri, who guided the club to sixth place in the final table and attained automatic qualification for the UEFA Cup.

The biggest success of the season was the effectiveness of club record signing Jimmy Floyd Hasselbaink, who found the net 23 times in 35 Premiership games in a partnership with Chelsea's 34-year-old Italian superstar, Gianfranco Zola, who found the net on 9 occasions.

Team kit
The team kit was produced by Umbro and the shirt sponsor was Autoglass. Chelsea's home kit was all blue with a white trimmed collar. The club's third kit for this season was orange with blue shorts and accents.

Final league table

Results summary

Results by round

Results

Charity Shield

Premier League

UEFA Cup

First round

FA Cup

Worthington Cup

First team squad
Squad at end of season

Left club during season

Reserve squad

Transfers

In

Out

 Total spending:  £34,100,000
 Total income:  £20,000,000
 Overall loss/gain:  £14,100,000

Statistics

|}

References

External links
 Chelsea FC Official Website
 Chelsea FC on Soccerbase
 Chelsea FC on BBC

Chelsea F.C. seasons
Chelsea